Vance Criswell McCormick (June 19, 1872 – June 16, 1946) was an American politician and prominent businessman from Harrisburg, Pennsylvania. He served as mayor of Harrisburg from 1902 to 1905 and as United States Democratic National Committee chairman from 1916 to 1919. He was appointed chair of the American delegation at the Treaty of Versailles in 1919, under President Woodrow Wilson.

Biography
McCormick was born in 1872 to Henry McCormick and Annie Criswell. He attended Harrisburg Academy and Phillips Andover before completing a civil engineering course at Yale University. McCormick graduated from Yale's Sheffield Scientific School in 1893, and was given an honorary MA degree by the university in 1907. While at Yale he was a member of St. Anthony Hall.  A born athlete and leader, he became captain of the class football and baseball teams his freshman year and was on the university football team his junior and senior years. Vance was named to Walter Camp's All American Team as the first team quarterback. He served as president of Intercollegiate Football Association his senior year and garnered other university honors and awards, as well, including class deacon. He was also student body president of Yale in 1893.

Business and politics
In 1902, McCormick began his career as journalist and publisher. He was president of The Patriot Company, publishers of several area newspapers including The Patriot (1902 to 1946), The Evening News (1917 to 1946), and Harrisburg Common Council (1900 to 1902). He was also president of the Pinkey Mining Company, located in Harrisburg.

In 1902, McCormick was elected mayor of Harrisburg and as part of the growing City Beautiful movement he immediately set about to improve the city. Today, he is credited with expanding the city park system (which eventually included 1,100 acres), built steps along the Susquehanna River and paved Riverfront Park (which still exists today), paved seventy miles of roads, and improved the city water system. During this time, the population of Harrisburg increased from 51,000 to 73,000. His uncle, Edward Z. Gross, would go on to succeed him as Mayor of Harrisburg in 1905.

In 1912, he served as a delegate to the Democratic National Convention from Pennsylvania. McCormick was the Democratic nominee for Governor of Pennsylvania in 1914, finishing second in a seven-candidate field. Republican nominee Martin Brumbaugh, Superintendent of the School District of Philadelphia, defeated McCormick on the strength of a strong performance in Philadelphia and Allegheny counties. From 1916 to 1919,  McCormick served as chairman of the Democratic National Committee and went on to be appointed chair of the American Commission to Negotiate Peace (1919) at Versailles, under President Woodrow Wilson, heading up numerous clubs and organizations along the way. He also served as Wilson's 1916 campaign manager, as chair of the War Trade Board (1916 to 1919) and as a member of many local, state, national and international organizations throughout the later years.

He helped professor Thomas Garrigue Masaryk legions especially in Russia in 1918.

Later life
McCormick remained a bachelor until the age of 52, when he married the widow of Martin Olmsted, an eight-term Republican Congressman. They announced their engagement on December 29, 1924. Vance died at his country estate (Cedar Cliff Farms), June 16, 1946, near Camp Hill, Pennsylvania. Mrs. McCormick died in 1953. McCormick was a teetotaler for his lifetime.

Head coaching record

References

External links
 Vance Criswell McCormick papers (MS 478). Manuscripts and Archives, Yale University Library. 

 McCormick Family History at the Center of Pennsylvania Culture Studies at Penn State Harrisburg
 

:la:Vance C. McCormick

1872 births
1946 deaths
19th-century players of American football
All-American college football players
American football drop kickers
American football halfbacks
American football quarterbacks
Burials at Harrisburg Cemetery
Carlisle Indians football coaches
Democratic National Committee chairs
Harrisburg Academy alumni
Mayors of Harrisburg, Pennsylvania
Phillips Academy alumni
Players of American football from Pennsylvania
Yale Bulldogs football players